Pitcairnia oaxacana is a plant species in the genus Pitcairnia. This species is endemic to Mexico.

References

oaxacana
Endemic flora of Mexico
Plants described in 1937